Bari or Bary in Iran may refer to:
 Bari, East Azerbaijan
 Bari, Zanjan
 Bari, West Azerbaijan